Elmbridge is a small community, mainly clustered in a village and forms a civil parish in Worcestershire, England.

Geography

It occupies the top of the gentle, mainly green, vale of the Elmbridge Brook which feeds south a few miles into Droitwich Spa, there flowing into the short River Salwarpe, in navigability superseded by the parallel Droitwich Canal, both left-bank tributaries of the Severn.  The ecclesiastical parish has essentially the same boundaries.  A long, north–south, strip parish, it broadens in the southwest to take in the minor neighbourhood of Broad Common which straddles the streets Kidderminster Road and The Knoll and a little of adjacent Broad Alley.  Near Broad Common it takes in about half of the linear neighbourhood Cutnall Green along the Kidderminster Road namely an Indian restaurant & bar, Oak Tree Bar and most of Forest Drive, all forming a 20th-century first-developed area of homes, mainly with gardens. Ambridge, the fictional village in the fictional county of Borsetshire, in The Midlands,  may possibly have been based on Cutnall Green.

Beside the church is a public green and in private land set behind buildings, opposite, is a pond.

Demography
As at the census date of Sunday 27 March 2011, four weeks before Easter, ten of its 475 residents (or their parents) stated they were pupils or students living at their non-term-time address.

Amenities
Its Anglican church dedicated to Saint Mary is largely a Victorian reconstruction of a medieval building.

References

External links

Villages in Worcestershire